The Technical University of Cluj-Napoca - North University Centre of Baia Mare is the campus of Technical University of Cluj-Napoca, in Baia Mare, Romania.

History 
The school traces its origins to the North University (Romanian: Universitatea de Nord din Baia Mare (UNMB)), a former public university founded in 1974, under the name of Higher Education Institute (Romanian: Institutul de Invățămint Superior); in 1991, changed into Baia Mare University (Romanian: Universitatea Baia Mare), and from 1996, North University).
In 2011, the UNBM Senate voted to affiliate with the Technical University of Cluj-Napoca. The fusion process ended with the 2012 academic elections.

About 
The Technical University of Cluj-Napoca, is an “Advanced Research and Education University” as awarded with the Order of the Ministry of National Education no 5262/September 5, 2011, is today a tertiary educational institution having both tradition and national and international recognition.
The Technical University comprises at present 12 faculties, in the two academic centres of Cluj-Napoca and Baia Mare as well as in locations, such as Alba-Iulia, Bistrița, Satu-Mare and Zalău.
The educational offer, aligning the Bologna system, includes Bachelor, Master, Ph.D. programmes of study as well as lifelong educational programmes. The domains of study range widely from engineering to architecture, from fundamental sciences to social sciences, humanities and arts. The Department of Lifelong Learning, Distance Learning, and part-time courses also organizes activities and lifelong courses, post graduate programmes, as well as courses for professional development and occupational standards.

Fully integrated in the international academic life, The Technical University of Cluj-Napoca pays attention to the international exchange of values, an aspect that is visible in the over 200 interuniversity agreements and in the large number of student mobilities. The opening towards the European and world space of education and research through an internationalization process represents one of the major objectives of the university.

Besides education, research is the main priority of The Technical University of Cluj-Napoca. Research structures, from centres to platforms, are operational within all the faculties of the university. The performance related to the economic and social environment, international cooperation and visibility, scientific novelty and pluridisciplinarity defines the research environment of our university. The fields of research cover a wide range, from engineering – most largely covered – to fundamental, social, humanistic and artistic fields. The research lines are also oriented along the world priorities and perspectives, that is from information technology and communications to renewable energies and ecology, from superconductivity, spintronics and nanomaterials to management and robotics, from mechatronics and electrical engineering to vehicles and future dwelling or urban planning and society, humanities and arts.
The Technical University of Cluj-Napoca is defined by dynamism and a proactive spirit; it operates in the light of the international exigencies of our times, while striving to range itself among the academic institutions that possess traditions and values leading to societal prosperity and progress.

Faculties
The campus keeps the structure of the former university with three faculties:
 Faculty of Engineering;
 Faculty of Letters;
 Faculty of Science.

References

External links
 https://www.utcluj.ro/
 https://www.optiuni.ro/universities/28
 https://inginerie.utcluj.ro/prezentare.html
 https://stiinte.utcluj.ro
 https://litere.utcluj.ro
 https://ziarmm.ro/admitere-2017-vezi-cate-locuri-sunt-disponibile-la-centrul-universitar-nord-baia-mare/
 https://www.utcluj.ro/studenti/organizatii/

Nord, Universitatea de Nord
Buildings and structures in Baia Mare
Educational institutions established in 1974
Education in Maramureș County
1974 establishments in Romania